Rishabesvarar Temple is a Siva temple in Sengam in Tiruvannamalai district in Tamil Nadu (India).

Vaippu Sthalam
It is one of the shrines of the Vaippu Sthalams sung by Tamil Saivite Nayanar Appar.

Presiding deity
The presiding deity is known as Rishabesvarar. The Goddess is known as Anubambikai.

Senganma
In Malaipaṭukaṭām this place is referred as Sengama. Later it became known as Sengam and Kannai.

References

Hindu temples in Tiruvannamalai district
Shiva temples in Tiruvannamalai district